Elections to the Tobago House of Assembly have taken place every 4–5 years since its establishment in 1980. There are twelve electoral districts, each electing one representative. The People's National Movement has been successful in all five elections between 2001 and 2017. Between 1980 and 1996, parties achieving a majority were the Democratic Action Congress and the National Alliance for Reconstruction.

1980

1984

1988

1992

1996

2001

2005 

Buccoo/Mt Pleasant
Terrence Holmes (DAC): 456, Albert Pilgrim (PNM): 1100.

Canaan/Bon  Accord
George Archer (DAC) 592, Frank Roberts (PNM): 824

Black Rock/Spring Garden
George Graham (DAC): 684, Claudia Groome-Duke (PNM): 1,146

Plymouth/Golden Lane
Hochoy Charles (DAC): 874, Godwin Adams (PNM): 1,070

Providence/Mason Hall/Moriah
Ashworth Jack (DAC): 931, Quashie Rennison (PNM): 885

Belle Garden/Goodwood
Wendell Berkley (PNM): 1,018, Tracy Nathalie Tobias (DAC): 718

Parlatuvier / L'anse Fourmi / Speyside
Anthony Knolly Christmas (DAC): 726, Spencer Adlington (PNM): 1,031

Roxborough / Delaford
Cecil Caruth (DAC): 715, Hilton Sandy (PNM): 1,039

Bacolet / Mount Saint George
Cynthia Loretta Alfred (PNM) 845, Orville Clyde Jordan (DAC): 842

Lambeau / Signal Hill
Barry Nelson (DAC): 537, Oswald Wilson (PNM): 1130

Scarborough / Calder Hall
Orville London (PNM): 1,039, Judy Michelle Bobb (DAC): 548

2009

2013

2017

In the elections of 23 January 2017, the People's National Movement won 10 seats, and the Progressive Democratic Patriots won two.

References

Elections in Trinidad and Tobago
Lists of elections
Politics of Trinidad and Tobago
Tobago